St Patrick's College is a Catholic maintained co-educational school located in Ballymena, County Antrim, Northern Ireland.

History
The school was opened on 8 September 1959 by Dr Daniel Mageean, Bishop of the Roman Catholic Diocese of Down and Connor. It was known then as St Patrick's Voluntary Secondary Intermediate School.  As the school grew in size and pupils stayed on post-16, it changed its name to St. Patrick's College offering a broader range of courses.

College Motto
On the college badge are the letters A.M.D.G.. This is an abbreviation of Ad Majorem Dei Gloriam which can be translated as For the greater glory of God.

Academics
A full range of subjects is offered at GCSE, A-Level and BTEC.  At GCSE A-level, the students can choose courses from Applied Art & Design, English, Applied Health & Social Care,  History, ICT, Performing Arts, Polish and Religious Studies. As part of the Ballymena Learning Together consortium of schools students can access optional courses in Applied Business, Chemistry, Environmental Technology, Government & Politics, Engineering, Moving Image Arts, Psychology, Physics, Business Studies, Drama, Geography, Mathematics, Music, and Sociology.  They can also access several BTEC courses.

With the arrival of the children of immigrants from Eastern Europe, the school has appointed Polish teachers and Czech, Romanian and Bulgarian teaching assistants.  Students are now able to take GCSE courses in Polish.

Sports
The students have the opportunity of participating in such sports as badminton, volleyball, Gaelic football, soccer, camogie, and hurling.

Principals
 1959 - 1981 Mr Seamus McCracken
 1981 - 1986 Mr P O'Hagan 
 1986 - 1989 Mr M McCrory
 1989 - 1993 Mr D Gillan
 1993 - 2004 Mr L Raven
 2004 - 2017 Mrs Catherine Magee
 2017–Present Dr Martin Knox.

Notable alumni
 Liam Neeson - actor

See also
 List of secondary schools in Belfast
 List of secondary schools in Northern Ireland

References

1966 establishments in Northern Ireland
Belfast
Educational institutions established in 1966
Catholic secondary schools in Northern Ireland